Keresan Sign Language, also known as Keresan Pueblo Indian Sign Language (KPISL) or Keresign, is a village sign language spoken by many of the inhabitants of a Keresan pueblo with a relatively high incidence of congenital deafness (the pueblo is not identified in sources, but the cited population suggests it is Zia Pueblo, New Mexico). 

Keresan Sign Language developed locally, and is unrelated to the trade language Plains Indian Sign Language.

References

Sign languages of the United States
Puebloan peoples
Village sign languages
Indigenous languages of New Mexico